Mohamed Aamer (born March 17, 1986) is an Egyptian actor. Early in his acting career he appeared in popular series like Khatem Sulaiman. When he did that role that introduced him to a large audience was with actor Khaled Elsawi, then he starred in the well known series "Bab Al Khalq" as the tough guy, which seemed to be his role in most of his hit roles afterwards, then he presented TV shows and programs like "El Zaffa 2" and others.

Television                                                                   
 Khatem Soliman – 2011
 Bab Al Khalq – 2012
 Eishq Al Nesaa – 2014
 Azmet Nasab – 2016
 Naseeby wa Qesmtk (PT2) – 2018

TV programs  
 El Zaffa II

Theatre 

 Al Mosarea' w Hala Al Turk

References

External links
 Mohamed Aamer at ElCinema.com (Arabic)

1986 births
Living people
Egyptian male film actors
Egyptian male television actors
Egyptian male stage actors
Male actors from Cairo